Frank Edward Clarke (21 November 1886 – 12 July 1938) was a Conservative Party politician in England.

He was elected at the 1931 general election as Member of Parliament (MP) for Dartford, and held the seat until his death in 1938, aged 51.

References

External links 
 

1886 births
1938 deaths
Conservative Party (UK) MPs for English constituencies
UK MPs 1931–1935
UK MPs 1935–1945